Taimur Khan (born 28 January 1996) is a Pakistani cricketer. He made his first-class debut for Rawalpindi in the 2014–15 Quaid-e-Azam Trophy on 6 December 2014.

References

External links
 

1996 births
Living people
Pakistani cricketers
Rawalpindi cricketers
Place of birth missing (living people)